International Rights Advocates, Inc., filed an injunctive relief and damages class-action lawsuit against Apple, Microsoft, Dell, and Tesla in December 2019. The plaintiff was representing fourteen Congolese parents and children seeking relief and damage fees for these companies aiding and abetting the use of young children in the Democratic Republic of Congo (DRC) cobalt mining industry. The plaintiff also pursued relief on the common law basis of negligent supervision, enrichment, and intentional infliction of emotional distress.  In November 2021, a federal judge dismissed the suit, ruling, among other things, that there was no causal relationship between the companies and the individuals' injuries.

Background 
Before the area became established as the Democratic Republic of the Congo, it had a significant population which was seen as fertile ground utilized by slave traders. After the 19th century, industrialization began to boom, bringing in many who wanted to extract the natural resources in the area. In the late 1800s, King Leopold II of Belgium claimed the area as personal property and levied forced labor through quotas set in place. Under King Leopold, the Congo faced a reign of terror which can be seen through many Congo memoirs left by civilians during his rule. From ivory to the rubber craze in the 1900s, any noncompliant civilian was punished. After its independence in 1960, The Democratic Republic of Congo was presented with leaders such as Mobutu Sese Seko (1949–1965), Laurent-Deisre Kabila (1997–2001), and Joseph Kabila (2001–2019) who all left the DRC in extremely impoverished conditions over time.

Democratic Republic of the Congo's global supply 

The DRC is rich in natural resources such as copper, tin, tungsten, tantalum, gold, and most importantly, cobalt. About seventy-five percent of the cobalt supply globally comes from the Katanga “copperbelt.” This belt is a part of a world-class cobalt and copper deposit that stretches from northeastern Zambia all the way to the southeastern Democratic Republic of Congo. Cobalt is a crucial component when it comes to rechargeable lithium-ion batteries, which are immensely valuable to companies like Tesla and Apple, who are acclaimed in the field of technology and electronics. According to the case filed by the International Rights Advocates group, all companies accused in the lawsuit were knowingly profiting and providing provision to the mining system in DRC.

Venue and jurisdiction 
The Plaintiff in the case are bringing their case to the United States judicial district because DRC contains no law for them to seek reparation against cobalt consumers functioning outside of the DRC. The parties on the side of the Plaintiff would be compromising their safety due to the governmental conditions present in the Democratic Republic of Congo. Due to the human rights forum provided under the 2013 Trafficking Victims Protection Reauthorization Act. Due to the claimed damages made towards the Plaintiff taking place in the United States, they do not have the ability to contest their claims in the DRC.

Defendants responses 
After the lawsuit was filed against these companies, the respondents moved forward by stating their company's ethics and code of conduct. Apple declined to respond or comment about the lawsuit allegations. Apple also told CNN Business that the company “remains deeply committed to the responsible sourcing of materials into our products.” Apple also shared their full list of cobalt refiners and stated that they do not purchase the cobalt from supply chains that do not meet their standards. They also mentioned the refiners they removed from their chains in 2019. Dell stated that they are “committed to the responsible sourcing of minerals” and upholding the human rights of workers. They also claimed that they have “never knowingly sourced operations using any form of involuntary labor, fraudulent recruiting practices or child labor.” Along with this statement, they claim to have eliminated supply chains if any transgression has been seen. Google has responded by saying that they have been working with industry and supply groups to eliminate the problem. Microsoft and Tesla did not comment on the allegations presented by the International Rights Advocates group. The defendants also claim to have “voluntary programs” to put a stop to the utilization of forced and child labor in their supply chains.

References 

Child labour
Apple Inc. litigation
Dell
Microsoft litigation
Tesla, Inc.
Mining in the Democratic Republic of the Congo